The Utkal Plain is part of the East Coastal Plain of India. It is a coastal plain in the Odisha state of eastern India. It includes the delta of the Mahanadi River, Brahmani River, Baitarani River. The most prominent physiographic feature of this plain is the Chilka Lake. It is the biggest lake in the country and its area varies between 780 sq km in winter to 1,144 sq km in the monsoon months.

Utkal Plains, coastal plains in eastern Orissa state, eastern India. Extending over about 16,000 square miles (41,400 square km), the plains are bounded by the Lower Ganges (Ganga) Plain to the north, the Bay of Bengal to the east, the Andhra Plains to the south, and the Eastern Ghats to the west. The Utkal Plains are coastal lowlands consisting chiefly of Mahanadi delta deposits and marine sediments, and they merge with the Eastern Ghats at an elevation of about 250 feet (76 metres). The plains have a nearly straight shoreline.

Paleogene and Neogene alluvium (from about 65 to 2.6 million years ago) with patches of ancient Archean gneiss and sandstone (from about 4 billion to 2.5 billion years ago), the plains are widest in the deltaic regions. Sand dunes of decomposed granites and zircon, created mainly by the action of wind at low tide, and lagoons are found along the Bay of Bengal. Chilka, the largest lake in the region (in the southwest), is salty; Samang and Sur (north and northeast of Puri, respectively) are freshwater lakes. Littoral forests are found along the coast of the Cuttack and Balasore areas, and tropical moist deciduous forests are found inland throughout the regions near Puri and Cuttack. The Mahanadi, Brahmani, Baitarani, and Subarnarekha rivers are often subject to heavy flooding; the combined outflow of these rivers has formed the Mahanadi delta in the northern part of the plains. The region has fertile red and black soils.

Agriculture is the main occupation, and rice is the principal crop; pulses (legumes) and oilseeds are also grown. Major irrigation projects located in the plains permit double-cropping. Industry, centred in Cuttack, Bhubaneshwar, and Puri along the Kolkata-Chennai (Calcutta-Madras) railway, includes paper mills, refrigerator plants, and the production of ceramics, glass, refractories, textiles, and galvanized pipe. The plains have a network of roads and railways, inland waterways in Cuttack, and an airfield at Bhubaneshwar.

Buddhism flourished in the Utkal Plains in the 3rd century ce under the Mauryan emperor Ashoka, and the region is described in the rock edicts of Dhauli as forming part of the ancient Kalinga territory. Successive ancient dynasties including the Satavahanas, Karas, and Eastern Gangas ruled the region until, in the latter half of the 16th century, it passed to the Muslims and later to the Marathas. The British assumed control of the plains in 1804.

References

Plains of India
Landforms of Odisha